Books is an extended play (EP) by Scottish indie pop band Belle & Sebastian in 2004 on Rough Trade Records. The EP features "Wrapped Up in Books" from Dear Catastrophe Waitress, two new songs—"Your Cover's Blown" and "Your Secrets"—and "Cover (Version)", a remix of "Your Cover's Blown" by the band's keyboardist Chris Geddes. The front cover features Alexandra Klobouk. The EP reached number 20 on the UK Singles Chart and number 46 in Ireland.

The Japanese release of the EP included a Japanese version of "I'm a Cuckoo" and a version of the Young Marble Giants song "Final Day" (slower than the version released on the 2003 Rough Trade compilation Stop Me If You Think You've Heard This One Before) as the fifth and sixth tracks.

Track listings
CD and DVD (RTRADESCD180, RTRADEDV180)
"Your Cover's Blown" – 6:01
"Wrapped Up in Books" – 3:34
"Your Secrets" – 3:11
"Cover (Version)" – 4:00

7-inch vinyl (RTRADES180)
"Your Cover's Blown" – 6:01
"Wrapped Up in Books" – 3:34

Personnel
 Frank Arkwright – Mastering
 Belle & Sebastian – Producer, Design
 Susan Bohling – Cor Anglais
 Richard Colburn – Director, Writer
 Mick Cooke – Director, Writer
 Chris Cowie – Oboe
 Chris "Big Dog" Davis – Sax (Tenor)
 Tony Doogan – Producer
 Chris Geddes – Director, Writer, Mixing
 Trevor Horn – Producer
 Stevie Jackson – Director, Writer
 Bob Kildea – Director, Writer
 Andrea Kuypers – Flute
 Sarah Martin – Director, Writer
 Julian Mendelsohn – Engineer, Mixing
 Stuart Murdoch – Director, Writer, Photography, Video Director
 Philip Todd – Sax (Tenor)
 Mark Trayner – Photography, Back Cover
 Phil Tyreman – Assistant Engineer
 Dan Vickers – Mixing

Charts

References

External links
 Books at belleandsebastian.com

2004 EPs
Belle and Sebastian EPs
Rough Trade Records EPs